Lowell was an unincorporated community in Napa County, California. It lies at an elevation of 66 feet (20 m).

References

Unincorporated communities in California
Unincorporated communities in Napa County, California